Jonathan Kimball Keyworth (born December 15, 1950) is a former American football running back in the National Football League for the Denver Broncos for his entire career from 1974-1980.  He played college football at the University of Colorado and was drafted in the sixth round of the 1974 NFL Draft. He also had a musical career and released an album, Keys.

References

1950 births
Living people
American football running backs
Colorado Buffaloes football players
Denver Broncos players
Players of American football from San Diego